The Maersk Alabama hijacking began on 9 April 2009, when four pirates in the Somali Basin seized the U.S. cargo ship  at a distance of  southeast of Eyl, Somalia. The siege ended after a rescue effort by the United States Navy on 12 April.

The incident was the first successful pirate seizure of a ship registered under the U.S. flag since the early 19th century. Many news reports cited the last pirate seizure as being during the Second Barbary War in 1815, although other incidents are believed to have occurred until at least 1822. It was the sixth vessel in a week to be attacked by pirates, who had previously extorted ransoms of tens of millions of dollars.

At the time of the hijacking, Maersk Alabama was owned by the Danish shipping company Maersk Line. The ship has since been acquired by Element Shipmanagement SA and has been renamed . , the ship is still in active service.

The story of the incident was reported by Captain Richard Phillips, who had been master of the vessel at the time of the incident, in the 2010 book A Captain's Duty, which he co-wrote with Stephan Talty. The book was later adapted as the U.S. 2013 film Captain Phillips, starring Tom Hanks.

Background 
The crew members of Maersk Alabama had received anti-piracy training from union training schools, and had drilled aboard the ship a day prior to the attack of 8 April. Their training included the use of small arms, anti-terror, basic safety, first aid, and other security-related courses.

Events

Hijacking 
On 8 April 2009, four pirates based on  attacked the ship. All four of the pirates were between 15 and 18 years old, according to Secretary of Defense Robert Gates. When the pirate alarm sounded, Chief Engineer Mike Perry brought 14 members of the crew into a secure room that the engineers had been fortifying for such a purpose. As the pirates approached, the remaining crew fired flares. In addition, Perry and First Assistant Engineer Matt Fisher swung the ship's rudder, which swamped the pirate skiff.

Nonetheless, the ship was boarded. Perry had initially taken main engine control away from the bridge and Fisher had taken control of the steering gear. Perry then shut down all ship systems and the entire vessel "went black." The pirates captured Captain Richard Phillips and several other crew members minutes after boarding, but soon found that they could not control the ship.

Perry remained outside the secure room lying in wait, knife in hand, for the pirates to locate the missing crew members in order to gain control of the ship and presumably sail it to Somalia. Perry tackled the ringleader of the pirates, Abduwali Muse, and took him prisoner after a cat-and-mouse chase in a darkened engine room. Muse cut his hand trying to keep Perry's knife away from his neck. Muse was then tied up and his wounds were treated by Second Mate Ken Quinn.

Later, after suffering in the overheated secure room for hours, the crew attempted to exchange the pirate whom they had captured for the captain, but the exchange went awry and the pirates refused to honor the agreement after the crew released their captive. Phillips escorted the pirates to a lifeboat to show them how to operate it, but then the pirates fled in the lifeboat with Phillips as a hostage.

Hostage situation 
On 8 April, the United States Navy guided-missile destroyer  and the guided-missile frigate  were dispatched to the Gulf of Aden in response to the hostage situation, Halyburton carrying two SH-60B Seahawk helicopters on board. The ships reached Maersk Alabama early on 9 April. Maersk Alabama was then escorted from the scene to its original destination of Mombasa where Captain Larry D. Aasheim took command of the ship. Phillips had relieved Aasheim nine days earlier. CNN and Fox News quoted sources stating that the pirates' strategy was to await the arrival of additional hijacked vessels carrying more pirates and additional hostages to use as human shields.

A stand-off began on 9 April, between Bainbridge, Halyburton, and the pirates' lifeboat from Maersk Alabama, on which they held Phillips hostage. The lifeboat was covered and contained plenty of food and water but lacked basic comforts, including a toilet or ventilation. Bainbridge was equipped with a ScanEagle unmanned aerial vehicle and rigid-hulled inflatable boats. Both vessels stayed several hundred yards away, out of the pirates' range of fire. A P-3C Orion surveillance aircraft secured aerial footage and reconnaissance. Radio communication between the two ships was established. Four foreign vessels held by pirates headed towards the scene. A total of 54 hostages were on two of the ships, citizens of China, Germany, Russia, the Philippines, Tuvalu, Indonesia, and Taiwan.

On 10 April, Phillips attempted to escape from the lifeboat, but was recaptured after the captors fired shots. The pirates then threw a phone and a two-way radio dropped to them by the U.S. Navy into the ocean, fearing the Americans were somehow using the equipment to give instructions to Phillips. The U.S. Navy dispatched another amphibious assault ship, to the site off the Horn of Africa. The pirates' strategy was to link up with their comrades, who were holding various other hostages, and to get Phillips to Somalia where they could hide him and make a rescue more difficult for the Americans. Anchoring near shore would allow them to land quickly if attacked. Negotiations were ongoing between the pirates and the captain of Bainbridge and FBI hostage negotiators. The captors were also communicating with other pirate vessels by satellite phone.

However, negotiations broke down hours after the pirates fired on Halyburton not long after sunrise on Saturday, 11 April. The American frigate did not return fire and "did not want to escalate the situation". No crew members of Halyburton were injured from the gunfire, as the shots were fired haphazardly by a pirate from the front hatch of the lifeboat. "We are safe and we are not afraid of the Americans. We will defend ourselves if attacked," one of the pirates told Reuters by satellite phone. Phillips' family had gathered at his farmhouse in Vermont awaiting a resolution to the situation. Later that day, Maersk Alabama arrived in the port of Mombasa under U.S. military escort. An 18-man security team was on board. The FBI then secured the ship as a crime scene. Commander Frank Castellano of USS Bainbridge stated that as the winds picked up, tensions rose among the pirates and "we calmed them" and persuaded the pirates to be towed by the destroyer.

Rescue 

On Sunday, 12 April, United States Navy SEAL snipers of Red Squadron, Naval Special Warfare Development Group armed with semi-automatic rifles engaged and killed the three pirates on the lifeboat. Captain Phillips was rescued uninjured. Commander Castellano, with prior authorization from higher authority, ordered the action after determining Phillips' life was in immediate danger, citing reports that a pirate was pointing an AK-47 rifle at Phillips' back. Snipers fired multiple shots from Bainbridges fantail, killing the three pirates with bullets to the head.

The SEALs had arrived Friday afternoon after being parachuted into the water near Halyburton, which later joined with Bainbridge. At the time, Bainbridge had the lifeboat under tow, approximately  astern. One of the pirates killed was Ali Aden Elmi, the last name of another was Hamac, and the third has not been identified in English-language press reports.

A fourth pirate, Abduwali Muse, aboard Bainbridge and negotiating for Phillips' release while being treated for an injury sustained in the takeover of Maersk Alabama, remained in custody. The bodies of the three dead pirates were turned over by the U.S. Navy to unidentified recipients in Somalia in the last week of April 2009.

Aftermath

Trial 
Muse, the surviving pirate, was held in 's afloat brig and was eventually flown to the United States to stand trial. Prosecutors brought charges in a federal courtroom in New York City that included piracy, conspiracy to seize a ship by force, and conspiracy to commit hostage-taking.

Muse's lawyers asked that he be tried as a juvenile, alleging that he was either 15 or 16 years old at the time of the hostage-taking, but the court ruled that Muse was not a juvenile and would be tried as an adult. He later admitted that he was 18 years old, and pleaded guilty to hijacking, kidnapping, and hostage-taking charges in lieu of piracy charges. He received a prison sentence of 33 years and 9 months.

Lawsuit 
On 27 April 2009, Maersk Alabama crew member Richard E. Hicks filed a lawsuit against his employer, Waterman Steamship Corporation and Maersk Line, Ltd., for knowingly sending him into pirate-infested waters near Somalia. Houston attorney Terry Bryant, representing Hicks, said the ship owners knowingly exposed their employees to imminent danger and took no steps to provide appropriate levels of security and safety for their employees.  He filed a notice of non-suit on December 2, 2009, ending the case, likely pursuant to a settlement agreement.

Legacy 

The owners of Maersk Alabama donated the bullet-marked 5-ton fiberglass lifeboat upon which the pirates held Captain Phillips hostage to the National Navy UDT-SEAL Museum in Fort Pierce, Florida, in August 2009. The lifeboat had recently been on loan to National Geographic for its "Real Pirates" exhibition at the Nauticus marine science museum in Norfolk, Virginia.

The producers of the Captain Phillips film visited the Museum while re-creating the lifeboat and interiors for the set. The lifeboat from Maersk Alabama is at the Museum. An example of the Boeing Insitu ScanEagle used to monitor the crisis is also on display,. The actual ScanEagle used in the mission is on display along with shell casings at the Museum of Flight in Seattle.

Two former DEVGRU Navy SEAL have claimed participation in the rescue, Matt Bissonnette (pseudonym Mark Owen) and Robert O'Neill. Both also participated in Operation Neptune's Spear that killed Osama bin Laden.

See also 
 List of ships attacked by Somali pirates
 Piracy off the coast of Somalia

Footnotes

External links 
 

2009 crimes in Somalia
Anti-piracy battles involving the United States
April 2009 events in Africa
Hostage rescue operations
Maritime incidents in 2009
Naval battles of Operation Enduring Freedom
Piracy in Somalia
Somalia–United States relations